Tiny Music... Songs from the Vatican Gift Shop is the third studio album by American rock band Stone Temple Pilots, released on March 26, 1996, on Atlantic Records. After a brief hiatus in 1995, the band regrouped to record Tiny Music, living and recording the album together on a ranch located in Santa Ynez, California.

Tiny Music... saw Stone Temple Pilots moving away from the grunge sound present on their first two records and incorporating a wide variety of different influences. After debuting at No. 4 on the Billboard 200 in 1996, Tiny Music initially received mixed reviews, similar to the band's earlier work, but in the years since, the record has been acclaimed for radically reinventing the band's image. Tiny Music spawned three singles that reached No. 1 on the Mainstream Rock Tracks chart: "Big Bang Baby", "Lady Picture Show", and "Trippin' on a Hole in a Paper Heart".

Production
In early 1995, shortly after the band was forced to scrap two weeks' worth of recorded material, lead singer Scott Weiland was arrested for heroin and cocaine possession and sentenced to one year's probation. In the months following this incident, Weiland formed his own side-band, the Magnificent Bastards, and recorded songs for the Tank Girl soundtrack and for a John Lennon tribute album.

During this time the rest of the band decided to put together their own side project, which would later become the band Talk Show with Dave Coutts singing. In the fall of 1995, when Stone Temple Pilots regrouped to record again for Tiny Music, Robert and Dean got together to figure out which songs should be Tiny Music songs and which songs should be Talk Show songs. Dean would later say "Robert and I had about 30 songs, and we sat in the room one night and basically went down the list and marked next to every song: Scott, Scott, Dave, Scott, Dave, Dave, Scott.... It's really weird, because in all reality it was like 'Big Bang Baby' could've been on [the] Talk Show record and 'Everybody Loves My Car' could've been on Tiny Music."

Weiland's drug use continued after his sentence, and STP cancelled some of their 1996-1997 tour for Tiny Music so that he could go to rehab.

Musical style
Tiny Music displays a drastic change in the band's sound, featuring music strongly influenced by '60s rock and bands such as The Beatles. Stephen Thomas Erlewine of AllMusic stated in his review of the album that "Tiny Music illustrates that the band aren't content with resting on their laurels" and "STP have added a new array of sounds that lend depth to their immediately accessible hooks," naming shoegaze and jangle pop as two examples of genres explored on the album. Erlewine also wrote that the album "showcases the band at their most tuneful and creative."

Doug McCausland of Alternative Nation said "Tiny Music really gelled the individual band members' musical tastes together into a new sound: vocalist Weiland's underground punk and glam sensibilities, guitarist Dean DeLeo's upbringing in sixties and seventies rock, and bassist Robert DeLeo's interest in genres like jazz and bossa nova."

Album artwork
The album cover, created to resemble a 70s-style LP cover and based on an idea from Weiland, features a woman in a swimsuit standing in a pool with a crocodile in it. The cover was made by John Eder, The cover model was a family friend of art director John Heiden. Said John Eder, "The little altar in the background was a last minute addition Scott wanted to put in, and it actually existed in his house, where I went to shoot it."

Release

Initial critical reception

Rolling Stone favored the album, regarding it as the group's best effort to date. They expressed surprise, however, at "the clattering, upbeat character of the music" given Weiland's much-publicized run-ins with drugs and the law. The magazine also featured STP on its cover of issue No. 753 in February 1997.

David Browne of Entertainment Weekly, however, was less favorable of the album, writing that "none of it... has a distinct personality."

Band photographer John Eder recounts of the mixed reception, "I remember [Tiny Music] getting totally trashed critically, for example in Entertainment Weekly, with the critic even singling out and making fun of the bands' physical appearances – like, their actual body types – in the little snapshot fold-out thing that came in the CD."

Retrospective reception
Following Weiland's death, Billy Corgan of The Smashing Pumpkins posited, "It was STP's 3rd album that had got me hooked, a wizardly mix of glam and post-punk, and I confessed to Scott, as well as the band many times, how wrong I'd been in assessing their native brilliance. And like Bowie can and does, it was Scott's phrasing that pushed his music into a unique, and hard to pin down, aesthetic sonicsphere. Lastly, I'd like to share a thought which though clumsy, I hope would please Scott In Hominum. And that is if you asked me who I truly believed were the great voices of our generation, I'd say it were he, Layne, and Kurt."

In 2016, The A.V. Club noted that Tiny Music "was an almost shocking leap forward in creative ambition" and that "[STP] got weirder and better than anyone gives them credit for."

In 2021, Pitchfork published a positive review of the 25th anniversary reissue of Tiny Music, observing that it is "primarily an album of expansion" and acknowledged their original 1996 review (in which writer Ryan Schreiber wished that Weiland would "tie [himself] off and fall directly into space forever") as "genuinely deplorable." Pitchfork critic Marty Sartini Garner also praised the band's 1997 Panama City Beach concert included in the reissue, stating that it "captures Stone Temple Pilots' power as a live band."

Commercial performance
In the United States, the album debuted at number four on the Billboard 200 albums chart on the issue dated April 13, 1996, with 162,500 copies sold. This was a significant decline when compared to the bands previous efforts and can in part be attributed to the decline of grunge in the mid-90’s. Because of the tour cancellation, Tiny Music did not receive as much exposure as initially intended. The album was certified 2× platinum but was not as commercially successful as STP's first two albums.

Track listing

Personnel
Credits adapted from the album's liner notes.

Stone Temple Pilots
Scott Weiland – lead vocals, percussion on "Press Play"
Dean DeLeo – guitar, bass on "Press Play" and "Big Bang Baby"
Robert DeLeo – bass, guitar on "Press Play", "And So I Know" and "Daisy"; backing vocals on "Big Bang Baby" and "Lady Picture Show"; vibraphone and electric harpsichord on "And So I Know"; percussion on "And So I Know"
Eric Kretz – drums, percussion on "Pop's Love Suicide", "Lady Picture Show" and "Art School Girl"; piano on "Adhesive"

Additional personnel
Brendan O'Brien – producer, mixing, piano on "Press Play" and "Big Bang Baby"; percussion on "Pop's Love Suicide", "Lady Picture Show", "Art School Girl" and "Seven Caged Tigers"; organ and clavinet on "Art School Girl"
Dave Ferguson – trumpet on "Adhesive"
Nick DiDia – recording engineer
Caram Costanzo – 2nd engineer
Chris Goss – vocal engineer
Tracy Chisholm – vocal engineer
Stephen Marcussen – mastering
Ron Boustead – digital editing
John Eder – photography
John Heiden – art direction

Charts

Weekly charts

Year-end charts

Singles

Certifications

References

1996 albums
Albums produced by Brendan O'Brien (record producer)
Atlantic Records albums
Stone Temple Pilots albums